Lake Sfânta Ana is the only crater lake in Romania located in the volcanic crater of the volcano named Ciomatu Mare of the Eastern Carpathians, near Tușnad in the Natural Reserve of Mohoș, Harghita County, Romania.

Palynology studies concluded that the history of Lake Saint Anne began about 9,800-8,800 years ago, at the stage of peat bog and shallow lake.

It has an oval form and an area of 220,000 m².

According to measurements made in 2005, the maximum depth of the lake is 6.4 m and the sediment thickness is about 4 m. The lake is supplied exclusively from precipitation, therefore the degree of mineralization of the water is very low. The water purity approaches of that of distilled water, with only 0.0029 ml mineral

In winter, the lake is covered with a layer of ice of up to 1 m. The lake is part of the Mohos Nature Reserve.

Near the lake there is a Roman Catholic chapel dedicated to Saint Anne.

Swimming in the lake in general is prohibited since April 2018. It is available only for sporting events under special permits.

References

Sfanta Ana
Sfanta Ana
Sfanta Ana
Sfanta Ana